Yeniseysk is a town in Krasnoyarsk Krai, Russia, located on the Yenisei River. Population:    20,000 (1970).

History
Yeniseysk was founded in 1619 as a stockaded town—the first town on the Yenisei River. It played an important role in Russian colonization of East Siberia in the 17th–18th centuries. Its location is due to the Siberian River Routes from the Urals, up the Ob, up the Ket River and over a portage to Yeniseysk and from there to the Yenisei basin. It became less important due to road and rail building further south. Its old town is included by the Russian government in the country's tentative World Heritage List.

Administrative and municipal status
Within the framework of administrative divisions, Yeniseysk serves as the administrative center of Yeniseysky District, even though it is not a part of it. As an administrative division, it is incorporated separately as the krai town of Yeniseysk—an administrative unit with the status equal to that of the districts. As a municipal division, the krai town of Yeniseysk is incorporated as Yeniseysk Urban Okrug.

Transportation
The town is served by the Yeniseysk Airport.

Climate
Yeniseysk has a subarctic climate (Köppen climate classification Dfc), with long, severely cold winters and short, warm summers. Precipitation is moderate, and is somewhat higher in summer than at other times of the year.

References

Notes

Sources

 
Cities and towns in Krasnoyarsk Krai
Populated places established in 1619
World Heritage Tentative List
1619 establishments in Russia
Yeniseysk Governorate
Populated places on the Yenisei River